Dilip Shanghvi (born 1 October 1955) is an Indian billionaire businessman and one of the country's richest people. He founded Sun Pharmaceuticals. The Government of India awarded him the civilian honour of the Padma Shri in 2016. India Today magazine ranked him 8th in India's most powerful people of 2017 list.

According to Forbes, as of October 2021, Shanghvi is the 14th richest person in India with a net worth of US$14.3 billion.

Early life 
Shanghvi hails from a Jain family settled in Kolkata. He was born in the small town of Amreli in the Indian state of Gujarat, the son of Shantilal Shanghvi and his wife Kumud Shanghvi. Shanghvi earned a Bachelor of Commerce degree from the University of Calcutta. He spent his childhood and college life with his parents in the Burrabazar locality of Kolkata. He is an alumnus of J. J. Ajmera High School and Bhawanipur Education Society College, where he did his schooling and graduation, respectively.

Career 
Shanghvi started by helping his father in his business, which was a wholesale dealership of medicines, mainly generic drugs, in Kolkata. It was during this work that he thought of manufacturing his own drugs instead of selling products made by others.

In 1982, the 27-year-old Shanghvi finally opened his first manufacturing unit with a capital of INR 10,000. He named his venture Sun Pharmaceutical Industries. The unit, located in Vapi in his native state of Gujarat, a short drive away from Mumbai, produced exactly one psychiatry drug. However, the business soon picked up, thanks to Shanghvi's acumen and energy, and by 1997, Sun Pharma was even able to acquire Caraco Pharma, an American company. Sun also acquired Israel's Taro Pharma in 2007. Shanghvi stepped down as chairman and CEO in 2012 and chose Israel Makov, formerly CEO of Teva Pharmaceuticals, as his successor; Shanghvi became managing director. In April 2014 Sun, Ranbaxy, and Daiichi Sankyo (the majority shareholder in Ranbaxy) agreed that Sun would acquire all outstanding shares of Ranbaxy for $3.2 billion in Sun stock and that Sun would take on $800M in Ranbaxy debt; the deal closed in March 2015 and made Sun the largest drug company in India and fifth largest in the world, and made Daiichi the second-largest shareholder in Sun.In May 2021 he stepped down from the position of Managing director of SPARC and will continue to function as a non-executive director and chairman.

Community 
In January 2018, the Indian government appointed Shanghvi to the Reserve Bank of India's 21-member central board committee. He is chairman of the board of governors at IIT Bombay. He was made a trustee of the Rhodes scholarship programme at Oxford University in 2017.

Personal life
He is married to Vibha Shanghvi. They have a son, Aalok and a daughter, Vidhi, both of whom work for Sun Pharmaceuticals.

Book 
In 2019, journalist Soma Das authored The Reluctant Billionaire, the first and only biography of Dilip Shanghvi. Published by Penguin Random House, the book was nominated for Tata Literature Award in the Best Business Book category in November 2019.

See also
 List of billionaires

References

External links
 

Indian billionaires
Businesspeople from Mumbai
Gujarati people
1955 births
Living people
University of Calcutta alumni
Bhawanipur Education Society College alumni
Indian businesspeople in the pharmaceutical industry
People from Amreli district
Recipients of the Padma Shri in trade and industry
Businesspeople from Kolkata
Rhodes Trustees
Reserve Bank of India
Indian Jains